The Old Town Hall is a historic town hall building at 10 Kendal Road in Tyngsborough, Massachusetts.  The wood-frame building was built in 1834 as a church to house the local Baptist congregation, a role it served until 1857, when it was sold to the town.  The styling of the building is predominantly Federal, although its cupola is a late 19th-century Colonial Revival addition.  The building was listed on the National Register of Historic Places in 2005.

After suffering a termite infestation in the 1990s(?), the town hall and the nearby Littlefield Library were closed. Their functions were moved to a new civic building away from the center. In 2012, the building underwent a $2.5 million renovation using Community Preservation Funds. The project concluded in December, 2013 and was reopened to the public in January 2014. It is primarily used for civic events and Special Hearings.

See also
National Register of Historic Places listings in Middlesex County, Massachusetts

References

Tyngsborough
Former seats of local government
Buildings and structures in Middlesex County, Massachusetts
Government buildings completed in 1834
National Register of Historic Places in Middlesex County, Massachusetts